Stanley Jack Rachman (January 19, 1934 – September 2, 2021) was a South African-born psychologist who worked primarily with obsessive-compulsive disorder (OCD) and other anxiety disorders. He spent much of his career based in the UK and Canada.

Career
Rachman worked primarily with obsessive-compulsive disorder (OCD) and other anxiety disorders. His contributions and achievements have been recognized by several awards. Rachman served on multiple editorial boards. He was the co-founder (with Hans Eysenck) and Editor in Chief of  the journal Behaviour Research and Therapy until his retirement. He has published books and hundreds of articles on obsessive-compulsive disorder and other anxiety disorders, recently proposing new cognitive models and treatments for obsessions and compulsive checking, as well as proposing a revised conceptualization of the fear of contamination.

Rachman was Emeritus Professor of Psychology at the Institute of Psychiatry, King's College London. In 1982, he moved to the University of British Columbia in Vancouver, British Columbia. He became Professor Emeritus of its Department of Psychology. He received the Lifetime Achievement Award from the Professional Practice Board of the British Psychological Society in 2009. He was also a Fellow of the Royal Society of Canada.

Personal life 
Stanley Rachman is the father of author Tom Rachman and journalist Gideon Rachman.

Selected bibliography

Books 
The Fear of Contamination: Assessment and Treatment (Cognitive Behaviour Therapy: Science and Practice) by Stanley Rachman (Paperback – Jun 22, 2006)
Obsessive-Compulsive Disorder: The Facts. Padmal de Silva and Stanley Rachman (Paperback – Dec 16, 2004)
Anxiety (Clinical Psychology, a Modular Course) by S. Rachman (Paperback – Oct 28, 2004)
Panic Disorder: The Facts by Stanley Rachman and Padmal de Silva (Paperback – Mar 18, 2004)
The Treatment of Obsessions (Medicine) by Stanley Rachman (Paperback – Mar 13, 2003)
The Psychological Management of Chronic Pain: A Treatment Manual/ Second Edition by H. Clare Philips and Stanley Rachman (Paperback – 1996)
Fear and Courage by Stanley Rachman (Paperback – Sep 1989)
Psychological analysis of courageous performance in military personnel by Stanley J Rachman (Unknown Binding – 1986)
Obsessions and Compulsions by Ray J Rachman Stanley J & Hodgson (Hardcover – 1980)
Contributions to medical psychology (Medical psychology international) by Stanley Rachman (Hardcover – 1977)
The Meanings Of Fear by Stanley Rachman (Paperback – 1974)
Aversion therapy and behaviour disorders: an analysis [by] S. Rachman and J. Teasdale. Foreword by H. J. Eysenck by Stanley Rachman (Hardcover – 1969)
Phobias: Their Nature and Control by Stanley Rachman (Hardcover – Jun 1968)

Articles
Rachman, S. Betrayal: A psychological analysis 2010 Behaviour Research and Therapy 48(4):304-11
Rachman S, Wilson GT. Expansion in the provision of psychological treatment in the United Kingdom. Behav Res Ther. 2008 Mar;46(3):293-5.
Rachman S, Radomsky AS, Shafran R. Safety behaviour: a reconsideration. Behav Res Ther. 2008 Feb;46(2):163-73.
Rachman S. Unwanted intrusive images in obsessive compulsive disorders. J Behav Ther Exp Psychiatry. 2007 Dec;38(4):402-10.
Herba JK, Rachman S. Vulnerability to mental contamination. Behav Res Ther. 2007 Nov;45(11):2804-12.
Fairbrother N, Rachman S. PTSD in victims of sexual assault: test of a major component of the Ehlers-Clark theory. J Behav Ther Exp Psychiatry. 2006 Jun;37(2):74–93.
Fairbrother N, Newth SJ, Rachman S. Mental pollution: feelings of dirtiness without physical contact. Behav Res Ther. 2005 Jan;43(1):121-30.
Thordarson DS, Radomsky AS, Rachman S, Shafran R, Sawchuk CN, Ralph Hakstian A. The Vancouver Obsessional Compulsive Inventory (VOCI). Behav Res Ther. 2004 Nov;42(11):1289-314.
Rachman S. OCD in and out of the clinic. J Behav Ther Exp Psychiatry. 2004 Jun;35(2):207-8.
Radomsky, A.S., & Rachman, S.  (2004).  The importance of importance in OCD memory research.  Invited paper in the Journal of Behavior Therapy and Experimental Psychiatry, 35(2), 137–151.
Radomsky, A.S., & Rachman, S.  (2004).  Symmetry, ordering and arranging compulsive behaviour.  Behaviour Research & Therapy, 42(8), 893–913.
Thordarson, D.S., Radomsky, A.S., Rachman, S., Shafran, R., Sawchuk, C.N., & Hakstian, A.R.  (2004).  The Vancouver Obsessional Compulsive Inventory (VOCI).  Behaviour Research & Therapy, 42(11), 1289–1314.
Radomsky, A.S., Rachman, S., & Hammond, D.  (2001).  Memory bias, confidence and responsibility in compulsive checking.  Behaviour Research & Therapy, 39(7), 813–822.
Radomsky, A.S., Rachman, S., Thordarson, D.S., McIsaac, H.K., & Teachman, B.A.  (2001).  The Claustrophobia Questionnaire (CLQ).  Journal of Anxiety Disorders, 15(4), 287–297.
Radomsky, A.S., & Rachman, S.  (1999).  Memory bias in obsessive-compulsive disorder (OCD).  Behaviour Research and Therapy, 37(7), 605–618.
Radomsky, A.S., Rachman, S., Teachman, B., & Freeman, W.  (1998).  Why do episodes of panic stop?  Journal of Anxiety Disorders, 12(3), 263–270.

See also
 Cognitive behavioral therapy
 Obsessive-compulsive disorder
 Hans Eysenck

References

1934 births
2021 deaths
Canadian psychologists
Obsessive–compulsive disorder researchers